The 2003 Gedling Borough Council election took place on 1 May 2003 to elect members of Gedling Borough Council in Nottinghamshire, England. The whole council was up for election with boundary changes since the last election in 1999 reducing the number of seats by 7. The Conservative Party lost overall control of the council to no overall control.

Background
At the last election in 1999 the Conservatives gained control of the council from the Labour Party with 29 seats, compared to 18 for Labour, 7 Liberal Democrats and 3 independents.

Boundary changes between 1999 and 2003 reduced the number of seats from 57 to 50. The changes included removing the wards of Cavendish, Conway and Priory, while creating new wards of Daybrook and Valley.

Election result
Overall turnout in the election was 32.4%, down from 35.0% in 1999.

Following the election a power sharing agreement was reached with the Conservative and Labour parties agreeing to share the post of leader of the council.

Ward results

References

2003 English local elections
2003
2000s in Nottinghamshire